The 2018–19 Miami Hurricanes men's basketball team represented the University of Miami during the 2018–19 NCAA Division I men's basketball season. Led by eighth-year head coach Jim Larrañaga, they played their home games at the Watsco Center on the university's campus in Coral Gables, Florida as members of the Atlantic Coast Conference (ACC).

Previous season
The Hurricanes finished the 2017–18 season 22–10, 11–7 in ACC play to finish in a four-way tie for third place. They lost in the quarterfinals of the ACC tournament to North Carolina. They received an at-large bid to the NCAA tournament where they lost in the first round to Loyola–Chicago.

Offseason

Departures

Incoming transfers

2018 recruiting class
There was no recruiting class of 2018 for Miami (FL).

Roster

Schedule and results

Source:

|-
!colspan=12 style=| Exhibition

|-
!colspan=12 style=| Non-conference regular season

|-
!colspan=12 style=| ACC Regular Season

|-
!colspan=12 style=| ACC tournament

Rankings

*AP does not release post-NCAA Tournament rankings

References

Miami Hurricanes men's basketball seasons
Miami
Miami Hurricanes men's basketball team
Miami Hurricanes men's basketball team